Blizzard is a surname. Notable people with the surname include:

Aiden Blizzard (born 1984), Australian cricketer
Bill Blizzard (1892–1958), American labor leader
Bob Blizzard (born 1950), British politician
Bobby Blizzard (born 1980), American football player
Brett Blizzard (born 1980), Italian-American basketball player
Christopher Blizzard, American computer scientist
Dominic Blizzard (born 1983), English footballer
Ed Blizzard (born 1954), American lawyer
Georgia Blizzard (1919–2002), American artist
Kevin Blizzard (1928–2004), Australian rules footballer
Les Blizzard (1923–1996), English footballer
Phillip Blizzard (born 1958), Australian cricketer
Robert M. Blizzard (1924–2018), American endocrinologist
Sara Blizzard (born 1970), English weather forecaster